Deh-e Gardaneh Rangak is a village in Poshtkuh-e Rostam Rural District, Sorna District, Rostam County, Fars Province, Iran. At the 2006 census, its population was 45, in 10 families.

References 

Populated places in Rostam County